Hradec nad Moravicí is a town in Opava District in the Moravian-Silesian Region of the Czech Republic. It has about 5,400 inhabitants. The historic town centre with the castle complex is well preserved and is protected by law as an urban monument zone.

Administrative parts
Villages of Benkovice, Bohučovice, Domoradovice, Filipovice, Jakubčovice, Kajlovec and Žimrovice are administrative parts of Hradec nad Moravicí.

Geography
It is located on the Moravice River in the Nízký Jeseník mountain range.

History

The area around Hradec nad Moravicí was first settled approximately in 3000 BC. A gord was built in the 8th century. The first written mention of Hradec and the local fortress is from 1060, when Bolesław II the Generous' army was defeated here.

After the fortress was damaged by fire in the mid-13th century, King Ottokar II of Bohemia had rebuilt it into an extensive Gothic castle. The castle gained importance in the years 1279–1281, when the widowed Queen Kunigunde lived here, and subsequently when it became the seat castle of the Duchy of Troppau. In 1481, the settlement was promoted to a town. In the Middle Ages, the town with the castle was never conquered.

Hradec was owned by the Czech kings until 1585, when Rudolf II sold it to Kašpar
Pruskovský of Pruskov. The town suffered during the Thirty Years' War and lost its town rights until 1702. In 1778, the Hradec estate was purchased by the princely house of Lichnowsky, who owned it until 1945.

The town experienced significant industrial growth in 19th century and a railway was connected to the town in 1905. In 1938, the town was annexed by Nazi Germany. It was returned to Czechoslovakia in 1945, and the town's German population was expelled. Between 1968 and 1972, several municipalities were annexed to Hradec. In 1972, the town was renamed Hradec nad Moravicí.

Demographics

Culture

Beethoven's Hradec is an annual cultural event held in Hradec na Moravicí, described as international music competition and music festival. It commemorates two stays of Ludwig van Beethoven at the castle and has been held regularly since 1960.

Sights

Hradec nad Moravicí is known for the Hradec nad Moravicí Castle. It is a complex formed by the older building, known as White Castle, newer building known as Red Castle, and a large castle park. The original Gothic castle was rebuilt into a Renaissance residence by the Pruskovský of Pruskov family after 1585. The castle was damaged by fire in 1796. It was reconstructed in the Empire style in 1796–1804, and the English-style park was founded. The White Castle has retained its Empire appearance to this day. In the second half of the 19th century, the complex was extended by the neo-Gothic Red Castle with stables, coach rooms and mural wall. The last structure built in the castle complex was the pseudo-Gothic White Tower.

Today the castle is owned by the state and is open to the public. It contains several expositions with valuable collections, and a gallery. It includes a valuable collection of exotic trees and shrubs.

The Church of Saints Peter and Paul was built between 1585 and 1594. It has the oldest bells in the region. Silesian Calvary is a pilgrimage site formed by Stations of the Cross from 1764, leading from the town to Kalvárie Hill.

Šance are the remains of 18th century military fortifications that were built during the Silesian Wars near Jakubčovice. It is the highest point of the town and an observation tower was built here in 2005.

Notable people
Felix Lichnowsky (1814–1848), nobleman and politician; lived here

Twin towns – sister cities

Hradec nad Moravicí is twinned with:
 Baborów, Poland
 Liptovský Hrádok, Slovakia

References

External links

 
Tourist Information Centre
Hradec nad Moravicí Castle

Cities and towns in the Czech Republic
Populated places in Opava District